

Portugal
 Angola – José de Almeida e Vasconcellos de Soveral e Carvalho, Governor of Angola (1784–90)
 Macau – Bernardo Aleixo de Lemos e Faria, Governor of Macau (1783–88)

Colonial governors
Colonial governors
1787